Nymphaea thermarum is the world's smallest water lily yet described. By comparison, the largest water lily has pads that can reach . All wild plants were lost due to destruction of its native habitat, but it was saved from extinction when it was grown from seed at the Royal Botanic Gardens, Kew in 2009. In January 2014, a surviving water lily was stolen from the Royal Botanic Gardens.

Taxonomy
Nymphaea thermarum was discovered in 1987 by German botanist Eberhard Fischer. The specific epithet, thermarum, refers to the hot spring and temperature that provided its native habitat. There are no common names for the plant, though Kew Gardens is informally calling it "pygmy Rwandan water lily".

Description
The very small flowers are white with yellow stamens, with the flowers held upright a few cm above the plant. They can self-pollinate, and after blooming the flower stalk bends so the fruit contacts the mud. The sepals are slightly hairy, and as large as the flower's petals. The plant is a tropical day bloomer displaying protogynous flowering patterns, opening early in the morning on the first day with female floral functioning, closing in early afternoon, and opening on the second day with male functionality. It is in the Nymphaea subgenus Brachyceras, though the leaves are more typical of the subgenus Nymphaea. It apparently does not form tubers. Seeds are large for plants in subgenus Brachyceras.

History
The plant's native habitat was damp mud formed by the overflow of a freshwater hot spring in Mashyuza, Rwanda.  It became extinct in the wild about 2008 when local farmers began using the spring for agriculture. The farmers cut off the flow of the spring, which dried up the tiny area—just a few square metres—that was the lily's entire habitat. Before the plants became extinct, Fischer sent some specimens to Bonn Botanic Gardens when he saw that their habitat was so fragile. The plants were kept alive at the gardens, but botanists could not solve the problem of propagating them from seed.

The first published occurrence of N. thermarum germination was by Carlos Magdalena, at the Royal Botanical Gardens, Kew. By placing the seeds and seedlings into pots of loam surrounded by water of the same level in a  environment, eight began to flourish and mature within weeks and in November 2009, the waterlilies flowered for the first time. During this time, a rat had eaten one of the last two surviving plants in Germany. With the germination problem solved, Magdalena says that the tiny plants are easy to grow, giving it potential to be grown as a houseplant.

References

External links

 
 The world's tiniest waterlily doesn't grow in water! by Carlos Magdalena
 
 International Plant Names Index

thermarum
Plants extinct in the wild
Plants described in 1988
Endemic flora of Rwanda